Boondoggle is an EP from The Lucksmiths released in 1994 on Candle Records (catalogue number LUCKY1.)

Track listing
 "Victor Trumper" - 2:03
 "Clever Hans" - 4:43
 "Summer Town" - 3:52
 "Tree" - 2:41
 "21" - 5:08
 "Umbrella" - 2:38
 "The Bakers Wife" - 0:58
 "Fridge Magnet Song" - 2:07

References

1994 EPs
The Lucksmiths albums